James McDaniel Hopper (September 1, 1919 – January 23, 1982) was a professional baseball player.  He was a right-handed pitcher for one season (1946) with the Pittsburgh Pirates.  For his career, he compiled an 0–1 record, with a 10.38 earned run average, and one strikeout in 4⅓ innings pitched.

He was born and later died in Charlotte, North Carolina at the age of 62.

External links

1919 births
1982 deaths
Pittsburgh Pirates players
Major League Baseball pitchers
Baseball players from North Carolina
Toronto Maple Leafs (International League) players
Birmingham Barons players
Columbus Red Birds players
Augusta Tigers players
Chattanooga Lookouts players
Seattle Rainiers players